The 2021–22 Drexel Dragons men's basketball team represented Drexel University during the 2021–22 NCAA Division I men's basketball season. The Dragons, led by sixth-year head coach Zach Spiker, played their home games at the Daskalakis Athletic Center in Philadelphia, Pennsylvania as members of the Colonial Athletic Association.

Previous season

In a season limited due to the ongoing COVID-19 pandemic, the Dragons finished the 2020–21 season 14–18, 4–5 in CAA play to finish in 6th place. They defeated Charleston, Northeastern, and Elon to win the CAA tournament championship. As a result, they received the conference's automatic bid to the NCAA tournament as the No. 16 seed in the Midwest region. There they lost to No. 1-seeded Illinois.

Offseason

Departures

Incoming transfers

Recruiting classes

2021 recruiting class

2022 recruiting class early commitments

Preseason 
In a poll of the league coaches, media relations directors, and media members at the CAA's media day, Drexel was picked to finish in third place in the CAA. Graduate student James Butler and senior guard Camren Wynter were selected to the Preseason CAA All-Conference First Team. Camren Wynter was also selected as the Preseason CAA Player of the Year.

Roster

Schedule and results
The Dragons' November 12, 2021 game against Fairleigh Dickinson was postposed due to travel issues. The game was rescheduled for December 2.

|-
!colspan=12 style=| Non-conference regular season
|-

|-
!colspan=12 style=| CAA regular season
|-

|-
!colspan=12 style=| CAA Tournament

Awards
James Butler
Preseason CAA All-Conference First Team
"Sweep" Award (team leader in rebounds)

Luke House
Donald Shank Spirit & Dedication Award

Matej Juric
CAA Dean Ehlers Leadership Award
Team Academic Award

Melik Martin
City of Basketball Love All–City 6 Second Team

Amari Williams
CAA Defensive Player of the Year
CAA All-Conference Third Team
CAA All-Defensive Team
City of Basketball Love Most Improved Player
CAA Player of the Week
Dragon "D" Award (team's top defensive player)
Samuel D. Cozen Award (team's most improved player)

Camren Wynter
CAA All-Conference First Team
City of Basketball Love All–City 6 First Team
Preseason CAA Player of the Year
Preseason CAA All-Conference First Team
Team Most Valuable Player
Assist Award (team leader in assists)

See also
 2021–22 Drexel Dragons women's basketball team

References

Drexel Dragons men's basketball seasons
Drexel
Drexel
Drexel